Henry Kingman was the founder of H.K. Webster, a feed manufacturing company in Lawrence, Massachusetts. The company is now part of Blue Seal.

Further reading
 Genealogical and personal memoirs relating to the families of ..., Volume 3 edited by William Richard Cutter page 1574

References

Living people
American businesspeople
Year of birth missing (living people)